General Sir William Boothby, 4th Baronet (4 May 1721 - 15 April 1787) was a senior British Army officer and one of the Boothby baronets.

Boothby saw active service during the Seven Years' War.

He was colonel of the 50th Regiment of Foot.

References

1721 births
1787 deaths
British Army generals
Baronets in the Baronetage of England
British Army personnel of the Seven Years' War